Leonora Okine (born July 11, 1981) is a Ghanaian actress, philanthropist and business strategist.

Personal life and education 
Leonora was born in Accra, Ghana. She received her early education at Bishop Joel Primary and JHS. She is an alumna of St Mary's Senior High School, Accra, where she completed her secondary school education.
She studied Biological Science at the University of Ghana, Legon, she further at Accra Business School where she earned an MBA in Project Management.  She continued in 2007 to study Operations and Project Management at the Ghana Institute of Management and Public Administration.

Acting career
Leonora's acting career started with a guest appearance in Ghanaian television series, Different Shades of Blue (2007).
In 2012 she replaced Matilda Obaseki in the Nigerian award-winning TV Series, Tinsel (TV series), playing the role of Angela Dede.
She played "Malaika" in seven episodes of MTV drama series, Shuga.
She has starred in Marrying the Game, Kpians: The Feast of Souls, Love and War, In Line, Beautiful Monster, and Desperation.

Filmography

Film
Enemy of My Soul (2008)
Beautiful Monster (2010)
Insurgents (2011)
Blood and Chocolate (2012)
Love and War (2013)
Kpians: The Feast of Souls (2014)
In Line (2017)
Wide Awake (2019)

Television
Different Shades of Blue (2007)
Secrets (2009)
Desperation (2009)
Happy Family (2011)
Tinsel (TV series) (2012)
5 Brides (2012)
Echoes (2012)
PEEP (2012)
MTV Shuga  (2013)
Married To The Game (2014)

Recognition 
Best Actress in TV Series category, Golden Movie Award Africa (GMAA), 2015.

References

External links

1981 births
Ghanaian film actresses
Living people